Sulina  is a municipality in the Brazilian state of Paraná. 
It has a humid subtropical climate.
As of 2020 the estimated population was 2,930.

Geography

Sulina is in the state of Paraná, Brazil.

Climate

The Köppen climate type is Cfa : humid subtropical climate.

Demographics

The population in the 2010 census was 3,314.
The estimated population as of 2019 was 2,981.
As of 2010, 99.2% of the population had attended school between the ages of 6 and 14. 
Also as of 2010, the municipal Human Development Index was 0.693.
This compares to 0.397 in 1991 and 0.614 in 2000.

On the 2010 census religion was reported as Catholic by 2979 people, Evangelical by 395 people and Animism by 0 people.

In 2017, the average monthly salary of formal workers was 2.3 minimum wages. 
Formally employed people were 12.8% of the total population. 
Households with monthly income of up to half a minimum wage per person represent 29.9% of the population.
Estimates of GDP per capita:

Health and sanitation

2.8% of households have adequate sanitation, 74.2% of urban households are on public roads with afforestation and 16.4% of urban households are on public roads with adequate urbanization (presence of manhole, sidewalk, pavement and curb).
Annual hospitalizations due to diarrhea are 2.8 per 1,000 inhabitants.
Deaths per 1,000 live births:

Municipal finances
Committed municipal expenditure by year:
Realized municipal revenue by year:

References

Sources

Municipalities in Paraná